Rostania is a genus of lichen-forming fungi in the family Collemataceae. The genus was circumscribed in 1880 by Italian botanist Vittore Benedetto Antonio Trevisan de Saint-Léon.

Species
 Rostania callibotrys 
 Rostania ceranisca 
 Rostania coccophylla 
 Rostania effusa 
 Rostania laevispora 
 Rostania multipunctata 
 Rostania pallida 
 Rostania occultata 
 Rostania populina

References

Peltigerales
Lecanoromycetes genera
Lichen genera
Taxa described in 1880
Taxa named by Vittore Benedetto Antonio Trevisan de Saint-Léon